Martin Reichel (born 7 November 1973) is a Czech-German former ice hockey player. He competed in the men's tournament at the 2002 Winter Olympics. He is the younger brother of Czech ice hockey player Robert Reichel and the father of Chicago Blackhawks prospect Lukas Reichel.

Career statistics

Regular season and playoffs

International

References

External links

1973 births
Living people
Olympic ice hockey players of Germany
Ice hockey players at the 2002 Winter Olympics
Sportspeople from Most (city)
Czech emigrants to Germany
Edmonton Oilers draft picks
Czechoslovak expatriate sportspeople in Germany
Czech expatriate ice hockey players in Germany
Naturalized citizens of Germany
Czechoslovak ice hockey centres
Czech ice hockey centres
German ice hockey centres